Antiplanes obliquiplicata is a species of sea snail, a marine gastropod mollusk in the family Pseudomelatomidae.

Description
The length of the shell attains 30 mm.

Distribution
This marine species occurs off the Kurile Islands, Russia and Northern Japan.

References

 Kantor, Yu I., and A. V. Sysoev. "Mollusks of the genus Antiplanes (Gastropoda: Turridae) of the northwestern Pacific Ocean." The Nautilus 105.4 (1991): 119–146.

External links
 

obliquiplicata
Gastropods described in 1991